Major General Curt Westberg (born  14 September 1943) is a retired Swedish Air Force officer. His senior commands include commanding officer of the Gotland Military District, Central Military District as well as Commandant General in Stockholm.

Career
Westberg was commissioned as an officer in the Swedish Air Force in 1970 with the rank of second lieutenant after graduating from the Swedish Air Force Flying Training School (Flygvapnets flygskola). He was promoted to lieutenant in 1972, to captain in 1975 and to major in 1983. Until 1983 he served most of the time at Norrbotten Wing (F 21), where he, among other things, served as squadron commander and flight commander. He flew AJ 37 Viggen (attack and light attack) an later in the 1990s, JA 37 Viggen (interceptor). He was promoted to lieutenant colonel in 1985 and served as wing commander of Norrbotten Wing from 1993 to 1994. He was promoted to colonel in 1994, and to senior colonel in 1995. On 1 October 1995, Westberg took command of the Production Department (Produktionsavdelningen) in the Air Force Command (C FVL PROD). There he was responsible for combat unit production, which included the development of both the war organization and the peace organization. Westberg was at the same time acting chief of the Air Force Command.

On 1 April 1997, Westberg was promoted to major general and appointed chief of the Joint Staff (Gemensamma staben, Gems) in the Swedish Armed Forces Headquarters. He then served at the disposal of the Supreme Commander from 1998 to 1999. In 2000, Westberg was appointed commanding officer of Gotland Military District. On 1 July 2001, Westberg took command as commanding officer of the Central Military District. He took office the same year as Commandant General in Stockholm. Westberg retired in 2003.

Westberg has also been chairman of the Swedish Armed Forces Personnel Responsibility Committee (Försvarsmaktens personalansvarsnämnd) and an expert in the Utredningen om Försvarsmaktens skolverksamhet ("The Investigation of the Swedish Armed Forces' School Activities").

Personal life
He is married to Marianne (born 1943), with whom he has two children.

Dates of rank
1970 – Second lieutenant
1972 – Lieutenant
1975 – Captain
1983 – Major
1985 – Lieutenant colonel
1994 – Colonel
1995 – Senior colonel
1 April 1997 – Major general

References

1943 births
Living people
Swedish Air Force major generals
People from Åre Municipality